Kenneth Nana Yaw Ofori-Atta (born 7 November 1958), is a Ghanaian investment banker who serves as the Minister for Finance and Economic Planning in the cabinet of Nana Akufo-Addo. He was a co-founder of Databank Group, a Ghanaian financial services company, and served as executive chairman until 2012, when he resigned. He was nominated by President Nana Akufo-Addo on 10 January 2017 and assumed office on 27 January 2017 as finance minister.

Early life and education
Ofori-Atta was born on 7 November 1958 in Kibi, a town in the Eastern Region of Ghana. He is a member of the Ofori-Atta family. He is the son of the economist and politician Jones Ofori Atta. Ofori-Atta attended Achimota School for his O-Level and A-Level certificate received in 1976 and 1978 respectively. He got a temporary job as a mathematics teacher at Accra Academy in the period after his A-level at Achimota. In August 1980, Ofori-Atta was enrolled in Columbia University for a B.A. in Economics. He graduated from Columbia in 1984 and worked at Morgan Stanley in New York. He studied for and received an MBA from the Yale University School of Management in 1988 and went to work for the investment bank,  Salomon Brothers.

Finance career
Ofori-Atta co-founded Databank Financial Services with Keli Gadzekpo and Togbe Afede XIV in 1990; he served as its executive chairman until 14 February 2012 when he went on retirement. He has other business interests in Insurance, Retail Banking, Private Equity, Micro-finance, Pharmaceuticals and Real Estate.
 
In 1996, Ofori-Atta was the first African to testify at the US Congress Ways and Means Committee to support the African Growth and Opportunity Act.

Ofori-Atta served as a director for numerous companies and as a member of some other boards as well. He was a Director for Enterprise Group Ltd and Trust Bank Ltd of The Gambia of which he is the chairman. He also was a Director at the International Bank and is also a board member of the Acumen Fund.

Political career
Ofori-Atta was President Nana Akufo-Addo’s nominee to assess the health of the economy during the transition period after the 2016 elections.

In May 2017, Akufo-Addo named Ken Ofori-Atta as part of nineteen ministers who would form his cabinet. The names of the 19 ministers were submitted to the Parliament of Ghana and was announced by the Speaker of the House, Rt. Hon. Prof. Mike Ocquaye. As a cabinet minister, Ken Ofori-Atta is an integral part of the inner circle of the president of Ghana, Nana Akufo-Addo, and is to aid in the key decision-making activities in the country.

Ofori-Atta was elected Chair of the World Bank/IMF Development Committee at the 2018 Spring Meetings and also Chairs the Governing Board of African Capacity Building Foundation (ACBF). In addition, he Chairs the African Caucus at the World Bank.

In November 2022, a motion of censure was started to remove Ken from office due to the decline of Ghana's economy, leading to the country's currency being ranked as one of the worst in the World. If successful, he will be removed as Minister of state

On the 10th of January 2023, Ofori-Atta was appointed caretaker minister of the Ministry of Trade and Industry following the resignation of Alan John Kyerematen.

Other activities
 Joint World Bank-IMF Development Committee, Chair (since 2018)
 African Development Bank (AfDB), Ex-Officio Member of the Board of Governors (since 2017)
 ECOWAS Bank for Investment and Development (EBID), Ex-Officio Member of the Board of Governors (since 2017)
 Multilateral Investment Guarantee Agency (MIGA), World Bank Group, Ex-Officio Member of the Board of Governors (since 2017)
 World Bank, Ex-Officio Member of the Board of Governors (since 2017)
 Chairman of the Board of Governors for The African Capacity Building Foundation(ACBF)

Awards and recognition
Ofori-Atta is a Henry Crown fellow of the Aspen Institute. He was adjudged as the 2nd most respected C.E.O in Ghana. Ken is a Donaldson Fellow at Yale University in 2010 and a recipient of the John Jay Award from Columbia University in 2011. He is a co-founder of the Aspen Africa Leadership Initiative.

He was honored by PricewaterhouseCoppers Ghana twice as one of the Top 5 Most Respected CEOs in Ghana.

In May 2018, he was adjudged Best Africa Finance Minister of the year by London-based magazine The Banker.

He was named one of Africa's most politically connected bankers by The Africa Report in 2021.

Personal life
Ofori-Atta is married to Professor Angela Lamensdorf Ofori-Atta, a clinical psychologist at the University of Ghana Medical School. The couple have four children.

References

|-

1959 births
Living people
Akan people
Columbia College (New York) alumni
Yale School of Management alumni
Alumni of Achimota School
New Patriotic Party politicians
Cabinet Ministers of Ghana
Finance ministers of Ghana
People from Eastern Region (Ghana)
Ken